St. Paul's Protestant Episcopal Church is a historic frame Episcopal church located at Tulls Corner, Somerset County, Maryland. Built in 1848, it is a Carpenter Gothic-style church sheathed with beveled-edge board-and-batten siding.  Also on the property is a cemetery surrounded by an early-20th century iron fence.

It was listed on the National Register of Historic Places in 1990.

References

External links
, including photo in 1987, at Maryland Historical Trust

Churches completed in 1848
19th-century Episcopal church buildings
Episcopal church buildings in Maryland
Churches on the National Register of Historic Places in Maryland
Churches in Somerset County, Maryland
Carpenter Gothic church buildings in Maryland
National Register of Historic Places in Somerset County, Maryland